Maria del Mar Bonnin Palou (born 12 May 1990 in Palma de Mallorca, Spain) is a Spanish professional road and track racing cyclist who rides for Lointek. Her last result is the 75th place for the general classification during the Festival Elsy Jacobs  in 2016.

See also
 List of 2016 UCI Women's Teams and riders

Teams 

 2016 - Lointek
 2015 - BZK - Emakumeem Bira
 2012 - Lointek

References

External links
 

1990 births
Living people
Spanish female cyclists
Place of birth missing (living people)
Sportspeople from Palma de Mallorca
Cyclists from the Balearic Islands